In developmental psychology, a scale error is a serious attempt made by a child to perform a task that is patently impossible because of the extreme differences in the size of the objects involved.  An example of this would be a child attempting to slide down a toy slide or attempting to enter and drive a miniature toy car.

Criteria for scale errors 
For an action to be considered a scale error under the strictest definition, a child must:
perform or attempt to perform part or all of the actions done with the large object, on the smaller object.
make actual physical contact with the relevant body part.
perform the behavior with such seriousness that they are obviously not pretending; often the behavior is repetitive, and the lack of success becomes frustrating to the child.
Basically, a scale error is an attempt to perform an impossible action combined with very precise motor activity.

DeLoache study 
In this study, children were introduced to large (normal-sized) objects and given a chance to familiarize themselves with them.  Some were also prompted to engage in play behavior with the objects.  After several minutes, the large objects were replaced with smaller versions of the same object.  In several cases, regardless of prompting, the child attempted to interact with the small object in the same way they would have interacted with the large object.

The study also found that if the child is given the choice, they will never choose to interact with the smaller object over the larger object.

It is believed that the error is caused by a disassociation between the part of the brain that controls the actual physical movement with the part that controls the planning of the action.  The occipital lobe, which sees the object and controls the planning of the action, recognizes the object as a chair but does not take the size of the chair into account.  The motor cortex, which controls the physical movement of the action, knows that you sit in a chair, and recognizes the small size of the object.  The child then takes "appropriate" action—attempts to sit in the chair, and aims remarkably accurately for the reduced space.

According to surveys taken by the researchers, the phenomenon is not common; parents more often reported that their child did not engage in the behavior.  It is speculated, however, that parents may not remember less striking errors or they may not have been present to witness them.

Age 
Very young children and older children do not engage in these behaviors.  Infants and young toddlers do not know enough about the physical world and the objects in it to attempt such errors.  Older children, it is believed, develop inhibitions; that is, they realize that performing the desired action on a tiny object is inappropriate.  It may be irrelevant that the action wouldn't work anyway.

References

Developmental psychology